Ron Sams is a former center and guard in the National Football League.

Biography
Sams was born on April 12, 1961, in Bridgeville, Pennsylvania.

Career
Sams was drafted in the sixth round of the 1983 NFL Draft by the Green Bay Packers and played that season with the team. The following season, he would play with the Minnesota Vikings until being traded to the New York Jets which he only played for during the preseason. He retired in 1986.

He played at the collegiate level at the University of Pittsburgh.

See also
List of Green Bay Packers players

References

1961 births
Living people
People from Bridgeville, Pennsylvania
Players of American football from Pennsylvania
Green Bay Packers players
Minnesota Vikings players
American football centers
American football offensive guards
Pittsburgh Panthers football players
University of Pittsburgh alumni